The 2019 Australian Grand Prix (formally known as the Formula 1 Rolex Australian Grand Prix 2019) was a Formula One motor race that was held on 17 March 2019 in Melbourne, Victoria. The race was contested at the Albert Park Circuit and was the first round of the 2019 FIA Formula One World Championship. The race marked the 84th race in the combined history of the Australian Grand Prix – which dates back to the 100 Miles Road Race of 1928 – the 24th time the event was held at the Albert Park circuit and the 35th time the Australian Grand Prix had been a part of the Formula One World Championship. This was the last Grand Prix held on this configuration of the Albert Park Circuit that had been in use since 1996 with the 2020 and 2021 events being cancelled and the 2022 event being run on an adjusted layout.

Lewis Hamilton entered the round as the defending World Drivers' Champion and his team, Mercedes, were the defending World Constructors' Champions. Hamilton got pole position for the race, equalling the record for most poles at one Grand Prix (8), but it was his Mercedes teammate Valtteri Bottas who won the Grand Prix from second on the grid.

Background

The Australian Grand Prix was officially confirmed as the first of twenty-one races of the 2019 Formula One World Championship at an FIA World Motor Sport Council meeting in Paris in December 2018. The race took place at the fifteen-turn,  Albert Park Circuit in Melbourne, Victoria on 17 March 2019. Melbourne's Federation Square hosted a season launch event, the first of its kind for the sport, in the week before the race.

Race Director Charlie Whiting died suddenly in the week before the race, so Deputy Race Director Michael Masi was named as Whiting's temporary successor. Local officials were appointed to fill Whiting's additional roles until a long-term appointment could be made ahead of the Bahrain Grand Prix. Masi remained the Race Director until the conclusion of the 2021 season.

Entrants

Twenty drivers representing ten teams entered the race. Racing Point also made their début as an independent constructor, having acquired the assets of the Sahara Force India team and having competed under the Force India name in 2018. Alexander Albon, Lando Norris and George Russell all made their competitive débuts. Meanwhile, Antonio Giovinazzi, Robert Kubica and Daniil Kvyat all returned to the championship.

Mission Winnow, the title sponsor of Ferrari, was banned from the race as it did not comply with local laws governing tobacco sponsorship.

Tyres

Tyre supplier Pirelli provided teams with an intermediate range of tyres for the race. Under rules introduced in 2019, Pirelli changed the designations of their tyres to rate the hardness of the compounds, with "C1" being the hardest and "C5" the softest. The colour-coding system used in previous years was simplified so that the white-coloured tyre wall represents the hardest compound available at any Grand Prix, a yellow tyre wall the medium compound and the red tyre wall the softest tyre. Pirelli nominated the C2 tyre as the white-banded hard compound, C3 as the yellow-banded medium and C4 as the red-banded soft.

Points system change

The race saw the introduction of a change to the points system. The system in use since  was retained, but drivers who set the fastest lap could be awarded a bonus point, provided that they finish the race inside the top ten. The bonus point is also awarded to the constructor of the driver that set the fastest lap.

Practice 
Lewis Hamilton was fastest in all three practice sessions. The sessions ran uninterrupted apart from an incident that saw Alexander Albon spinning out at turn 2 and hitting the wall during the first practice session. Albon was able to return to the pits for repairs. In the third practice session, McLaren released Lando Norris into the path of Robert Kubica which resulted in the McLaren team receiving a fine.

Qualifying 
The first qualifying session passed without incident until the final couple of minutes when Robert Kubica hit the wall coming out of turn 10, giving him a puncture. He later attributed this to a sudden increase in grip. The drivers knocked out in Q1 and finishing qualifying in sixteenth to twentieth respectively were Lance Stroll, Pierre Gasly, Carlos Sainz, George Russell and Robert Kubica, with Charles Leclerc setting the fastest lap time of the session. Gasly being knocked out came as a particular surprise and put his early exit down to unexpected track evolution. Sainz was also disappointed with his early exit from qualifying, especially considering his teammate qualified in eighth. Sainz attributed his early exit to having to slow down after Kubica got a puncture in front of him, forcing him to slow down on his qualifying lap.

The second qualifying session passed without incident and resulted with Nico Hülkenberg, Daniel Ricciardo, Alexander Albon, Antonio Giovinazzi and Daniil Kvyat being knocked out and finishing qualifying ranked eleventh to fifteenth respectively, with Lewis Hamilton setting a qualifying lap record to end the session fastest. The surprises came from the two Renaults of Ricciardo and Hülkenberg being knocked out after being considered as the fourth fastest team following pre-season testing, and from Lando Norris getting in to the top ten.

For the third qualifying session, all of the teams were able to have two attempts to set the fastest time. After the first attempt it was Valtteri Bottas who was leading, having beaten the qualifying lap record which Hamilton had set in Q2. Bottas was followed by Hamilton and Sebastian Vettel. During the second attempt in Q3, Hamilton improved his time by half a second to beat Bottas's lap record. As no one else improved their time sufficiently to beat any of the top three, it was Lewis Hamilton who took pole position, followed by Valtteri Bottas and Sebastian Vettel completing the top three. The top ten was completed by Max Verstappen, Charles Leclerc, Romain Grosjean, Kevin Magnussen, Lando Norris, Kimi Räikkönen and Sergio Pérez. In his post-qualifying interview Leclerc confessed that he wasn't happy with his performance, saying that he thought he was able to get into the top three but he was unable to do so due to an untidy lap. Meanwhile, Haas said that they were delighted with their performance of getting their cars into the sixth and seventh positions.

Qualifying classification

Race 
Valtteri Bottas started the race well from second place, and had the lead going into turn one. Further back, Daniel Ricciardo was contesting a position with Sergio Pérez, in which Ricciardo had to drive on the grass on the right side of the track to avoid Pérez. However, Ricciardo drove over a sunken bit of tarmac which caused his front wing to fall apart, spilling debris around that part of the track and causing him to drop to last, as he drove round with no front wing before pitting for a replacement. Max Verstappen was passed by Charles Leclerc who then proceeded to battle his teammate Sebastian Vettel. Vettel kept Leclerc at bay in 5th and Leclerc was overtaken by Verstappen. Robert Kubica also came into the pits on lap 1 after losing his front wing at the start, following contact with Pierre Gasly.

On lap 11, Carlos Sainz pulled over in his McLaren at the entrance to the pits, with a large plume of smoke emerging from the rear of his car, which was followed by an onboard fire. Kimi Räikkönen pitted on lap 13 whilst Pierre Gasly struggled to make progress from P17. Gasly only moved up to P12 despite being in a significantly faster car than those in front of him. Nico Hülkenberg and Pérez then pulled into the pits in search of an undercut, followed by Vettel who put on the medium tyres. Lewis Hamilton pitted a lap later onto the same tyre compound, and he emerged ahead of Vettel. Romain Grosjean then pitted but an issue on the front left tyre caused him to lose three positions during his pit stop. Antonio Giovinazzi went wide on the approach to turn 13, allowing Grosjean to pass through. Bottas, the race leader, made his pit stop on lap 23, with Verstappen following suit three laps later. Leclerc pitted from second place on lap 29. Daniel Ricciardo retired as a precaution following the lap 1 incident. Verstappen passed Vettel on lap 31. Grosjean pulled over on to the runoff area on the penultimate corner, after his front left wheel came loose. Daniil Kvyat went wide trying to pass Lance Stroll at turn 3 on lap 38. Bottas retook the fastest lap and won the Grand Prix by over 20 seconds to his teammate Hamilton. They were followed by Verstappen in third and the two Ferrari cars trailing in fourth and fifth. Bottas became the first driver to win a bonus point for the fastest lap of the race since Maurice Trintignant at the 1959 United States Grand Prix.

Race classification 

Notes
  – Includes 1 point for fastest lap

Championship standings after the race

Drivers' Championship standings

Constructors' Championship standings

 Note: Only the top five positions are included for both sets of standings.

See also
 2019 Melbourne 400

References

External links

Australia
2019
Grand Prix
2010s in Melbourne
Motorsport in Melbourne
March 2019 sports events in Australia